Jesika Malečková (born 16 August 1994) is a Czech tennis player.

Malečková has won ten singles titles and 18 doubles titles on the ITF Circuit. On 20 June 2016, she reached her best singles ranking of world No. 191. On 14 November 2022, she peaked at No. 109 in the doubles rankings.

In April 2016, Malečková made her WTA Tour main-draw debut at the 2016 Katowice Open where she received entry as a lucky loser. In qualifying, she had defeated Mandy Minella and Renata Voráčová, falling short in the final round to Isabella Shinikova. In the main draw, she lost to seventh seed Tímea Babos in round one.

Performance timelines
Only main-draw results in WTA Tour, Grand Slam tournaments, Fed Cup/Billie Jean King Cup and Olympic Games are included in win–loss records.

Singles 
Current after the 2023 Australian Open.

Doubles 
Current after the 2023 Monterrey Open.

WTA Challenger finals

Doubles: 1 (runner-up)

ITF Circuit finals

Singles: 20 (10 titles, 10 runner–ups)

Doubles: 33 (18 titles, 15 runner–ups)

Notes

References

External links

 
 

1994 births
Living people
People from Hořovice
Czech female tennis players
Sportspeople from the Central Bohemian Region
21st-century Czech women